Esperanza Martínez (born April 26, 1959) is a Paraguayan medical doctor and politician, senator for the left wing alliance Frente Guazu and an active member of the party Participación Ciudadana (PPC).  From August 2008 till June 2012 she was the Paraguayan Minister of Public Health and Social Welfare under President Fernando Lugo.

In May 2012 she was elected vice-president for the 65th World Health Assembly of the World Health Organization.

She is an advocate of liberalizing implementation of laws regarding abortion in Paraguay to help a pregnant 10-year-old who was raped by her stepfather, complaining that to those who opposed the treatment, the unnamed girl "became a uterus. She became a birth canal."

References

Living people
Government ministers of Paraguay
21st-century Paraguayan women politicians
21st-century Paraguayan politicians
Women government ministers of Paraguay
1959 births
Paraguayan physicians
Women physicians